CLC-1 may refer to one of the following:

USS Northampton, a United States Navy command light cruiser which served from 1953 until 1970
CLC-1 Radar, a ground-based mobile tracking radar used by the People's Liberation Army of China
 CLc1, is the commodity industry code for West Texas Intermediate crude oil future contracts to be finalized at the next monthly futures closing